Antoni 'Ton' Alcover Roige (born 17 January 1990) is a Spanish footballer who plays for CE L'Hospitalet as a central midfielder.

Club career
Born in Móra d'Ebre, Tarragona, Catalonia, Alcover finished his football formation with local Gimnàstic de Tarragona. He made one professional appearance with the club, playing 13 minutes against SD Eibar on 20 June 2009 – in Segunda División's last matchday – after coming on as a substitute for Mingo (0–1 away loss); he spent most of his spell with the club appearing for CF Pobla de Mafumet, the farm team.

In the summer of 2011, Alcover signed for CF Sporting Mahonés in Segunda División B, reuniting with former Nàstic teammate Biel Medina.

References

External links

Stats at FutbolEsta 

1990 births
Living people
People from Ribera d'Ebre
Sportspeople from the Province of Tarragona
Spanish footballers
Footballers from Catalonia
Association football midfielders
Segunda División players
Segunda División B players
Tercera División players
CF Pobla de Mafumet footballers
Gimnàstic de Tarragona footballers
CF Sporting Mahonés players
UE Costa Brava players
Ontinyent CF players
UE Sant Andreu footballers
CE L'Hospitalet players